Roger Nichols may refer to:

Roger Nichols (musical scholar) (born 1939), English writer specialising in French music
Roger Nichols (recording engineer) (1944–2011), American recording engineer, producer and inventor
Roger Nichols (songwriter), American composer and songwriter
Roger Nichols (motorcycle racer), British racer in the 1971-1976 Grand Prix motorcycle racing seasons